The 1974–75 Czechoslovak Extraliga season was the 32nd season of the Czechoslovak Extraliga, the top level of ice hockey in Czechoslovakia. 12 teams participated in the league, and TJ SONP Kladno won the championship.

Standings

1. Liga-Qualification 

 Ingstav Brno – LB Zvolen 4:1 (4:2, 6:1, 1:2, 6:1, 5:0)

External links
History of Czechoslovak ice hockey

Czechoslovak Extraliga seasons
Czechoslovak
1974–75 in Czechoslovak ice hockey